Ciudad del Carmen is a city in the southwest of the Mexican state of Campeche. , Ciudad del Carmen had a population of 169,466, up from the 2005 census of 154,197. In July 2006, Ciudad del Carmen celebrated its 150th anniversary as a city.

The city is nicknamed "The Pearl of the Gulf".  Ciudad del Carmen was a small city mostly devoted to fishing until the 1970s when oil was discovered in the region; since then it has grown and developed substantially.  To this day Carmen is known as one of the best locations to find seafood in Mexico.  As late as the early 1980s the city could long be reached only by ferry boats called "pangas" or small motorboats ("lanchas") operating between Ciudad del Carmen and Zacatal; this changed with the construction of a causeway bridge to the mainland in the 1980s (eastbound) and another one in 1994 (westbound).  The construction of the first bridge was motivated by the sinking of one of the island's pangas which resulted in the death of nearly everyone on board.  The bridge Puente El Zacatal, constructed in 1994, is one of the longest in Latin America.

This border area at the western edge of the Yucatán Peninsula was previously part of the state of Yucatán, then of Tabasco; since 1863 it has been part of the state of Campeche.  In 1840 the city had a population of about 7,000.

The city is also the seat of the state of Campeche's Carmen municipality, which includes the city and the surrounding area.  The 2010 census population of the municipality of Carmen was 221,094 people, second only to the capital municipality of Campeche.

The main university in Ciudad del Carmen is the Universidad Autónoma del Carmen (UNACAR).

Nomenclature

Toponymy 
The city takes its name from July 16 of 1717, Virgen del Carmen day, when pirates were defeated and expelled from the island by Alonso Felipe de Andrade in the fort of San Felipe.

Shield 
The Carmen shield is an oval limited by a gray periphery that has the name of the city and the state to which it belongs. In the center of the oval is the Laguna de Términos and on it the Isla del Carmen.

The lion symbolizes the European siege of Mexico during Spanish rule and French intervention, it is on the island and an eagle wounds it with its beak and claws. The eagle symbolizes the Carmelite people, preventing a foreign country from intervening in its territory and the nation.
The original shield of Ciudad del Carmen has the legend "The lagoon by Yucatán and both by the Mexican Republic". At the beginning of the 19th century, During the first years of Mexico as an independent country, the Carmen region was known as La Laguna and until the first years of the 20th century it was called that. The reason for the motto is that when it was created in 1828 the current state of Campeche had not yet been separated from Yucatán. It should be remembered that the island was part of the General Captaincy of Yucatán during the Spanish domination and in 1828 the Mexican nation was in formation after the territories that formed it gained their independence from the Spanish Empire in 1821.

History

Founded in the pre-Hispanic era, Ciudad del Carmen was an important location which served to connect the Aztec and Mayan civilizations. Between the 16th and 18th centuries when the city of Campeche was a trade hub between Spain and New Spain (Mexico), Ciudad del Carmen was inhabited by pirates and served as a port for repairing ships and planning attacks against the Spanish. A 1699 map of the Bay of Campeche indicates Isla del Carmen as two islands: Triest I and Port Royal I. On the opposite side of the lagoon there is a waterway marked as Logwood Creek; this indicates that the residents were probably English and logging was another of their activities.

The city got its current name on July 16, 1717, in honor of the Virgin of Carmen, believed to be the protector of the island, when the Spanish forces, commanded by Alonso Felipe de Andrade evicted the pirates from the island and took control the city after a long period of occupation. Since then, every year at the end of July, Ciudad del Carmen turns into the very center of the regional social, cultural and religious festivities, on the fair that celebrates the island's protector virgin.

Colonization 

The Isla del Carmen and its surrounding places were found on the discovery route. By 1518 the island was inhabited by indigenous people of Maya origin, by migrations of Toltec, Zapotec and Xutian tutul groups, conquerors of Xicalango. At the end of May of that same year, the Spaniards arrived aboard four ships at the desired port - Puerto Real or Isla Aguada. At the head of that expedition was Juan de Grijalva and, as an experienced pilot, Antón or Antonio de Alaminos, a navigation man who, to the recorder in his heading letters the Island of Trs (then for making reading difficult in the sea letters are added the letter "i" remaining as tris), from Terms, gave a sense that was the limit of the land discovered by them, although they also considered that there ended the great island they believed was Yucatán. The abbreviation Tris became usual in maps and navigation charts, giving birth to a memorable place for future events, since the colonization of the island was only made years later of the Spanish foundation of San Pedro de Champotón in 1537 and San Francisco de Campeche in 1540. After these initial moments of the Colony, it was pirates who arrived in 1558 to take refuge, first, after taking advantage of the natural resources of the Island of Terms.

Captured as a safe haven and converted into a base for different attacks by sea and land, the Tris Island seems to be destined to fulfill the functions played by Jamaica, in the power of the English since 1655, or the Tortuga Island, which the French dominated, that is to say, port of provisioning of the corsair ships.
Laguna or Isla del Carmen has, along with the territorial portion, a unique history for different reasons, among them, that the Spaniards discovered but did not conquer or colonize it; while the pirates made it a den and residence while fighting for neighboring lands and populating other places in the region. Its formal Spanish surgical colonization almost two centuries after the trip of Hernández de Córdoba (Francisco Hernández de Córdoba) and Grijalva to these places. Consequently, the buccaneers sat in that region their reals, and when they did not attack the commercial controls that passed near the place, they dedicated themselves to cutting the dye stick to send it to Europe. They were men of great physical strength, confirmed that the work they carried out, however criminal it was and effectively productive, is carried out in extremely difficult conditions, since the temperatures they supported in the jungle or along rivers and swamps exceeded 35 degrees, In addition to the humidity and the high number of insects, without neglecting the wide variety of vipers and arachnids.

Another historical explanation about the late colonization of the island was its location: in the most hidden area of the Gulf of Mexico, on the border with the indigenous Mayan and Tabscoobs tribes, and immediately to the isthmic region of Tehuantepec, together with its extraordinary timber wealth, but, for that reason, safe refuge of the lowlands that are dedicated to its traffic, reason why always it is constituted in object of ambition of other countries.

The problems of the [Europe of America Colony] remained on the mainland, with a slow and difficult colonization. Progress was made so slowly that, for example, on September 4, 1663, during the provincial government of Francisco Esquivel and de la Rosa, governor and captain general of Yucatán, came news that Tris Island was held by the pirates, who at that time already exploited, with great utilities, the dye stick.
 First expedition (1672)

Two decades had to pass for something to be done about it: on August 14, 1672, a decision was made and a first expedition to the island left the port of Veracruz with the intention of throwing the pirates who had possessed it into the sea; however, in October 1673, the expedition returned with the news of not being able to evict them.

 Second expedition (1680)

The stumbling blocks, with the discouragement capacity, did not fall into oblivion, and in the year 1680, the mayor of San Francisco de Campeche, Felipe González de la Barrera, put into operation what we can call the second expedition, which then fixed the mature port and reached Laguna, where rooms, houses, and dyewood were set on fire. The expulsion was temporary, however, because when the soldiers concentrated on the square from which they had left, the pirates returned to their inhabited tasks. However, the fact was considered so remarkable that the king granted the mayor the noble title of Count de la Laguna.

 Third expedition (1703)

The characteristics of the region at that time were not hospitable, and that is what I add the distance, what normally covered by water, and what required months and months to go from one place to another. In addition, the settlement of the peninsula passed slowly, and it took a little over two decades to send a third expedition to remove the pirates from the Lagoon. At the end of the seventeenth century there are about 600 people organized in Terms and Puerto Real, from 1686 to a considerable number of pirates returned to the island, restarting the harassment of Tabasco villages and taking out the Usumacinta. The Spaniards took over the initiative and Viceroy Gálvez supported the provinces of Tabasco and Yucatán, which in 1690 reconquered the place, but did not settle. Also, the viceroy sent engineer Jaime Frank to study the possibility of fortifying the island; but this one thought that it was not convenient, since when there were several entrances to the island, the opposites could surprise the soldiers and fortify.
It is Captain Francisco Fernández who overcomes pirate resistance around the years 1703–1704 with a coast guard, six canoes and 184 well-equipped and armed men. He arrested a hundred English outlaws and nine blacks, and destroyed facilities and boats, seized a small urca loaded with dye stick, a British-built patache with 800 quintals of Campeche stick, a Spanish brig, stolen before by pirates and another built in San Román; the victorious expeditionaries of a sloop, half a hundred canoes, useful for different movements also took over; good amount of rigging and miles of quintals of the stick already cut and ready to embark, but withdrew from the place due to lack of financial support. They made nothing despicable prisoners, like Isaac Hamilton, a London Jew whose mission was to ship the dye bound for New England; William Haven, a native of Jamaica, and John Elliot, a Londoner enlisted in Jamaica in the ranks of piracy. Booty and prisoners were transferred to San Francisco de Campeche, and the last ones sent to the capital of New Spain.

As the continuous pirate attacks, the Spanish authorities decided to organize an eviction of the pirates stationed on the island of Tris. This incursion is carried out in the month of May 1704, for which, the Viceroy sent the Mayor of Tabasco the order to incorporate the Laguna de Términos to carry out an attack along with Campeche forces. The Mayor of Tabasco Mayor, Alonso Felipe de Andrade, affected and personally controlled by 200 men and 14 canoes towards the Laguna de Términos. Andrade discovered fourteen pirate campaigns and after facing them, captured several pirates and artillery pieces that led to Tabasco after having stayed more than a month in the lagoon of Terms, entrances and exits to land and sea demarcated making a map.
 Fourth expedition (1707)

Several years have to pass again so that in 1707 — fourth attempt — the governor of Tabasco, Pedro Mier y Terán, sending forces to remove the pirates from the island. They succeed, but the circumstances are repeated: when leaving the place, the pirates return. It was the time when Barbillas settled on the island and from there captured ships and dismantled wineries of other ships. That is, as long as a group of inhabitants was not established, the region would change possession with relative ease.

 Fifth expedition (1716)

The English ships were seen returning in 1710, and on their way they sank a coast guard. It became impossible to admit eventualities in the matter of the lagoon of Terms, in such a way that the mayor of Tabasco, Juan Francisco Medina y Cachón, proposed an eviction strategy in which ships from the Windward Navy, based in Veracruz, and the naval forces of Tabasco and San Francisco de Campeche. Those chosen in San Francisco de Campeche for the expedition were: the frigate Nuestra Señora de la Soledad, owned by Mayor Ángel Rodríguez de la Gala; the frigate of Andrés Benito, the sloop of Sebastián García, two coast guard and several canoes for the service of the containers. Mérida,  Tacotalpa de la Real Corona and San Francisco de Campeche contributed 7,945 pesos from their royal boxes for the purchase of groceries, war gear and boat cage Preliminary movements were in operation when they had to depend: they reached San Francisco de Campeche the sailor Agustín Toledo, received from Laguna, warning that three English frigates were on the island, one of them with 20 guns, another of 16 and the last with 10; In addition, two brigs without artillery were prepared to ask for help in Jamaica.
Finally, the Mayor of Tabasco, Graniel de Gil, ordered the attack, and the fifth expedition departed from Tabasco on December 7, 1716, under the command of Sergeant Major and former Rulers of Tabasco Mayor of Tabasco, Alonso Felipe de Andrade; the pirates were defeated again, but this time the triumphant Tabasco forces did not withdraw, but instead established a garrison on the island which they named "Fort of San Felipe". The eviction, says Calderón Quijano:

Military post of El Carmen 

After that victory, the rapid construction of a defense lurch began, which is the origin of the current Ciudad del Carmen. The prison or fort floor was built with simplicity; the plans indicated that the building was perfectly square and regular, and that it had bulwarks at its angles.

Shortly after, more than a hundred buccaneers wanted to retake the territory and returned with more troops and war supplies, and attacked the Tabasco troops by surprise on July 15, 1717 at night, but courageously were rejected, with the blunt response of "men, bullets and gunpowder enough to defend themselves." The pirates urged De Andrade to surrender and he replied: "Men have enough gunpowder to not deliver the square."

Sergeant Alonso Felipe de Andrade counterattacked, snatched a shrapnel cannon and engaged in a memorable battle. The British pirates fled. Throughout the night, the locals continued to persecute those fleeing, at dawn July 16 of 1717, there was not a single pirate left alive on the island.

Final eviction of pirates 

Finally, in 1786, the Mayor of Tabasco Francisco de Amuzquívar sent the militias of Tabasco, under the command of the captain Juan de Amestoy and the lieutenant Francisco Interiano, who defeat and evict the English from la Isla del Carmen, reintegrating the island to Tabasco. and rebuilding the military post of   'Nuestra Señora del Carmen'   thus ending the presence of pirates in the region.

Since then never again the buccaneers, who were in possession of the island for about 200 years, exploiting their resources and attacking Spanish ships and the Tabasco coasts, where they forced the colonial authorities to change twice the capital of the province of Tabasco, of Santa María de la Victoria to Villahermosa de San Juan Bautista in 1641, and from there to  Tacotalpa of the Royal Crown in 1677. Undoubtedly, the expelled English are the ones who went to the opposite side - Belize - to continue their trade as smugglers and smugglers.

Dispute between Tabasco and Yucatán 

Since the colonial era there was a dispute between Tabasco and Yucatán for the possession of the island of Carmen. In 1540 the Province of Tabasco had its greatest extension, since the "... boundary that separated Tabasco from Yucatán was after Sabancuy, and the first Yucatecan people was Tixel". Still in 1817 Tabasco owned the island of Carmen, Palizada and Sabancuy. However, the country's government did not have a clear idea of the geographical location of the island, to such an extent that Iturbide, by order of September 2, 1822, made El Carmen depend on the state of Puebla. But in 1823 the restored Mexican Congress wanting to correct this error, ordered to be reinstated in the jurisdiction of Tabasco  "... adding the District of the Laguna de Términos"  to the General Command of Tabasco  fact that was consumed when the Electoral Law for the elections of deputies to the Second Constituent Congress of the Nation was published on June 17, 1823. However, in August 1824, due to pressure from the Yucatán government, Carmen's territory was segregated from Tabasco to be incorporated into Yucatán.

In 1842, the governor of Tabasco Francisco de Sentmanat, decided to invade Yucatán and took Palizada and El Carmen, segregating them from the Yucatecan jurisdiction and reinstating them to the Department of Tabasco, however, when it was overthrown, the new governor José Julián Dueñas returned the territories to Yucatán A few months later, Tabasco recovered the territory of El Carmen, when General Santa Anna decreed, on October 2, 1843, the pass of the El Carmen party to the jurisdiction of Tabasco. However, on July 15, 1854 the same general Antonio López de Santa Anna decreed the creation of the Territory of Carmen, with territory segregated to Tabasco and Yucatán, with which Tabasco was snatched almost the entire game of Usumacinta and the island of Carmen.

Later, on June 4, 1856, the governor of Tabasco José Víctor Jiménez sent a letter to the Constituent Congress of the Nation, raising his voice to request that his old limits be returned to Tabasco, "... to demarcate and extend the current limits of Tabasco with the states of Chiapas, Yucatán and Veracruz". On September 17, 1856, with 77 votes in favor by 8 against, there was the dissolution of the Territory of Carmen, recovering Tabasco only the Usumacinta party, while the district of El Carmen was added to Yucatán, this resolution was embodied in the 1857 Constitution, with which Tabasco lost the territory of El Carmen.

Villa title 

He was granted the title of villa by governmental provision of October 2, 1828, with his respective shield: a lion perched on the island that is eaten by the eagle; Around it bears the following legend: "La Laguna by Yucatán and both by the Mexican Republic".

In 1841, the town of Carmen was granted, by decree of October 26, the port height category because of the importance of its maritime trade. He also participated in national vicissitudes, struggles between federalists and centralists, and military conflicts. Following the fate of the peninsula, when they experience the split of the Mexican Republic in the 1840s, they chose separation and neutrality; in 1846, in the war against the United States, he followed the criteria that he had adopted on December 8 of that same year the City Hall of San Francisco de Campeche: without being oblivious to popular pressure, in a meeting he pronounced for a postponement of reinstatement until the national government is stable. The historian Bolivar points out that El Carmen was occupied by US forces, commanded by the Commodore Perry who made the line of the Parish; The state authorities contacted the occupation forces. According to Luis Ramírez Aznar, the political group of Santiago Méndez had established communication with Commodore Perry through a special shipment from José Robira, a man of Spanish nationality who had been raised in the United States and settled in Carmen; Méndez himself had visited the Commodore in the port of Veracruz. The neutrality of Yucatán was accepted on the condition of facilitating the occupation of Isla del Carmen (Campeche), which would be a US base in the region because of its importance. Robira presided over a popular meeting in which the neighbors asked Commodore Perry not to withdraw from the island when peace was signed between the United States and Mexico, until the Supreme Government was in a position to care for the security and defense of Carmen. This exhibition, signed on June 5, 1848, referred to the belligerence between the two countries, as well as the Caste War that had the peninsula in alarm:

From 1848, due to the social war, the population of Carmen and Sabancuy increased; the Party would count 12,352 inhabitants in the year of 1852, added those established in Palizada. By the year 1849, there was already agricultural production by the course of Palizada, Cerillos and Atasta. The existence of trapiches allowed to process panela, sugar and brandy; rice, corn, cotton, and vegetables, onions, peanuts and sweet potatoes were grown, among others. The town of Carmen caught fire on the days of March 16 to 18, 1850. The guano of the roofs, the weather and the weakness of the buildings caused them to be swept by fire, a tragedy whose origin was suspicious. But the population survived and three years later it was planned with the impulse of the authority exercised by General Tomás Marín.

The fire left those who had been prosperous merchants in misery; An example is the disappearance of the Preciat and Gual company, which lost goods for 10,000 pesos and buildings that were calculated with a value of 30,000 pesos; or the MacGregor house, which disappeared when three buildings that cost 20,000 pesos were reduced to ashes; Domingo Trueba lost in merchandise and buildings 56,000 pesos. Others were fortunate not to lose all of their assets in the fire, and two of the most important dye stick marketers were saved: Benito Anizán and Victoriano Nieves. Esteban Paullada also saved his estate.

Territory of El Carmen 

Shortly thereafter, in November 1853, only the region that comprised island was declared federal territory; subsequently, its jurisdiction was extended on July 15, 1854, extending from Punta Varaderos to the San Pedro and San Pablo river, on the coast. The City of San Francisco de Campeche, at the motion of the alderman Francisco Estrada Ojeda, agreed to recommend to the Superior Government of the peninsula to make every possible effort to return the Territory of Carmen to the state; the Yucatán government asked the Constituent Congress of 1856 for the restitution of that separate party and, after some discussions, the peninsular entity was reinstated with 77 votes in favor by 8 against, which resulted in the dissolution of the territory of Carmen , recovering Tabasco and Yucatán their respective territories.

A situation that paralyzed political concerns needs to be clarified; Justo Sierra O'Reilly dealt with the points on the items at the time, remembering that only the spirit of the party and interests drove that detachment, sponsored by the dictator Antonio López de Santa Anna, whose purposes were, during 27 months of his regime, split the great states of the nation to more easily impose the yoke and the influence of centralist power.

Because of the importance acquired and its marked development, the government of the president Comonfort decreed, on July 10, 1856, the title of city for Carmen, a fact that approved the Congress of the Union on September 17 of that same year. The population, before being part of the state, had already managed to integrate its personality: among the most characteristic neighborhoods were El Guanal, which was populated by families of Palizada, Atasta and San Francisco de Campeche; the del Jesús neighborhood, that of Tila, founded by Yucatecan families who came fleeing from the Caste War; La Puntilla, of fishermen; El Salitral, close to the stream of the French, and that of Fatima, just to name a few.

Status creation 
The conflict in the Yucatán Peninsula, between the politicians Méndez and Barbachano, continued, the caste war did the same.

Major difficulties in the peninsula were presented in 1857 due to irregularities in the election of the state governor, Pantaleón Barrera. Pablo García, who was then 33 years old and had been elected deputy, left the session room of the local Congress in Mérida in July, arguing falsehood of the electoral process. Immediately the uprisings began in different towns, mainly in the Campeche district, asking for new elections to be called; military forces persecuted the rebels, but placated some, others appeared. On the night of August 6, 1857, several Campechanos grouped around García and Pedro Baranda seized the bulwarks of Santiago and the Soledad in San Francisco de Campeche, as well as the artillery mastery. When the negotiations took place, they requested the dismissal of the Campeche City Council for its mendist affiliation, as well as that of the Customs administrator and other conditions that were not entirely justified. Shortly after, on August 9, Congress and Governor Pantaleón Barrera were unknown in the minutes of that date, due to lack of freedom in the elections. They stopped City Hall and named other people. Pablo García was appointed political and military chief, and began receiving accessions from other places in the district.
García's actions to unify in August 1857 the decision of the break with Yucatán, were not easy and he had to exercise the authority he held. Consequently, on the 19th he addressed the political chief of El Carmen asking him not to prevent the free manifestation of the lagoons, of whom he had knowledge that they wished to adhere to his project. He warned him that in order to protect the free expression he had instructed Captain Andrés Cepeda Peraza to disembark in Las Pilas with the forces under his command and, approaching the population, give the inhabitants an opportunity to express their opinions. Days later, thanks to Nicolás Dorantes and Ávila, García learned that he had the support of the lagoons. The fact was not peaceful, since there were victims: Jerónimo Castillo and Santiago Brito, who had resisted García's objectives, died within the proclamation. Likewise, Pablo García separated José del Rosario Gil from the political headquarters of Carmen and sent José García y Poblaciones from Campeche, to whom he also granted the party's military command.

From August to December 1857 numerous populations adhered to the proclamation of García and Barrera left the government in the hands of Martín F. Peraza. For all these reasons, it was no accident that in April 1858 there was a majority consensus for the creation of the new state. On May 3, 1858, the Territorial Division Agreement was signed, which among other points stipulated the respective dividing line, obligations in the war against the natives, taxes and tariffs; It was published in San Francisco de Campeche with the solemnity of the case on May 15. Immediate consequence of the Agreement was the issuance of a four-point document whereby the Government Board of the District of Campeche and Isla del Carmen declared that it was willing to establish itself in a state, recognizing Pablo García as governor and establishing that the designation of commander would fall in Pedro Baranda; They also appointed a Governing Council that would be integrated with five members.
The final decree of the creation of the new state was issued on April 29, 1863. The state was formed with one of the Yucatecan districts: that of Campeche (the others were Mérida, Tekax, Izamal and Valladolid), the district of Campeche was formed by the parties of Carmen, Champotón, Campeche, Hecelchakán and Bolonchenticul. The first governor was Mr. Pablo García y Montilla.

French intervention 

The suspension of the payment of the external debt gave the opportunity to England, Spain and France to get, again, a hegemonic place in Mexico, and sent their fleets to demand payment, arriving at Veracruz in January 1862.

On February 12, at four in the afternoon, the French war steamer "Le Granade" anchored in the Bay of Carmen, with the excuse landed armaments in the month of May. The struggle between the adherents to the conservative cause and the faithful to the Republic of Juarez became manifest, a meeting of authorities and connoted persons was called and, after a vote, Carmen remained as a French colony, the liberals had Than exile from the city.

In San Francisco de Campeche forces were organized to reconquer the island, the troops of the intervention under the command of Don Pedro Pucurul arrived at Palizada and in San Joaquin they fought. Loyal Carmelites addressed a proclamation to the inhabitants of the island to resist and defend the homeland, among the first was Arturo Shields. In Carmen, nature came to the rescue and the crew of "La Granade" died, in its entirety, of yellow fever, the only one who was saved was Captain Hoquart.

Campeche was the last bulwark of the liberals in the peninsula and after violent fighting they were dominated by the imperialist forces, giving the arrival to the country of Maximilian and Carlota. At the end of 1865, the Empress made a trip to the peninsula arriving at Carmen on December 17 aboard the Tabasco steam.

In early 1866, Pablo Gracia and other loyal Campechens returned to Carmen, entering Tabasco, to reorganize the release of Campeche. On April 23, 1867, the liberal forces, under the command of Don Juan Carbo, and the fleet, under the command of Vicente Campan, entered Carmen to take the place, upon obtaining it they were handed over by the political prefect of the territory José María Ponce.

The state began the path of progress, a statistical report of March 1871 indicated that they had exported to Europe, in the 1861-1870s, the figure of 4 million 650 thousand 139 quintals of dye stick.

Every day there were more than 25 ships of different nationalities docked at the docks and many others were waiting to dock. The dye stick extract plant was established with Belgian and French capital and the first electric current generator for lighting in the country was installed there, it was the year 1874.

The Revolution 

Obeying an economic trend, guided by the transition of land to private individuals, the Porfirio Díaz government handed over large concessions to foreign companies and connoted people in the region.

At the end of 1907, in El Carmen, two groups faced conflicting ideas, the one of friends of the Porfirian regime called "Club dos de Abril", who met at the pharmacy of Don Jesus Cervera, and the other called "The hornet" , who met in the pharmacy of Carlos González l.

On September 11, at the beginning of his campaign, Don Francisco I. Madero arrived by boat to Carmen from Tabasco, accompanied by his wife, Ms. Sara Pérez de Madero, from the graduates José María Pino Suárez  and Serapio Rendón and other supporters and collaborators from Tabasco. At night there was a rally in Zaragoza square, where Mr. Pino Suárez, Mr. Rendón and Francisco I. Madero himself took the floor.

Once the power was reached in 1912, there was a great economic collapse, the dissatisfied against President Madero faced a frank struggle, the Porfiristas for their part, struggled to regain power, all these facts led the country to the Tragic Decade. In the state the governor Manuel Castilla Brito rebelled.

In July 1914, Victoriano Huerta's forces were in frank defeat, Venustiano Carranza became the head of the revolution. Among the officers of the Venustiano Carranza pre-constitutional army, came the young Joaquín Mucel Acereto, who had lived in Carmen since childhood and abandoned his engineering studies at the beginning of the movement. Colonel Mucel is sent as chief of arms and governor. With the arrival of Mucel, several young Carmelites decided to enlist in the army, among them, Ramón Arcovedo, Ramón Vadillo, Alfonso Rosiñol del Valle, Benjamin Pérez, Marcos Almeida and José Ruiz.

From shrimp to oil 
Between 1946 and 1947, the inhabitants of the Isla del Carmen were looking for a way out of their economic crisis, according to data from Leriche, several were the projects that had in mind, from a great hotel until a factory of buttons, of all these projects the only one that was consummated was the installation of seafood packers. While these possibilities were being discussed on the island, domestic and foreign shrimp companies increased their presence on the coasts of Carmen, where the virgin [pink shrimp] banks of the Gulf were located.

Shrimp activity had an anarchic start, somewhat chaotic; however, it would mark Carmen's economy for the next 35 years. The benefits between this industry and those that preceded it, such as dye stick and precious wood, allowed the diversification of occupational activities in the region.

The discovery of oil, by fisherman Rudesindo Cantarell in March 1971 off the coast of Carmen, meant a new stage in the life of the city and an element of great importance in the destiny of the country.

Culture  
Sella Maris "The star of the sea" (in Latin 'Stella Maris') known as Statue of the Virgin of Carmen, is one of the most famous and visited monuments of 'Ciudad del Carmen'.  It is located two hundred meters from the boardwalk within the waters of the Laguna de Términos. This sculpture was inaugurated on the night of July 15, 2014 by ecclesiastical authorities and the State and municipal government before more than 15 thousand people who packed the esplanade of the monumental horn and part of the city boardwalk. The monumental structure of the 'Virgen del Carmen' , one of the works sponsored by the former owner of Oceanography, Amado Yáñez Osuna. At the time, Amado Yáñez's company reported that it allocated close to 44 million pesos in the filling and construction of the base. But, after the company's crisis was revealed, the municipality asked the state Congress for a 40 million pesos item to conclude the works, which the legislature denied the request, so it is unknown where the remaining money came from the play.
 Details of the work

More than 15 months it took the Mexican sculptor Sergio Andrés Peraza Ávila the realization of the sculpture in honor of the Virgen del Carmen Stella Maris' whose work of art the greatest in her artistic career has been the biggest challenge with more than 15 tons of bronze weight and 14 meters high, which keeps mystique and feeling in the process of its creation. To the sculptor in charge of the construction of the monument Stella Maris, he explained that it took more than 2 years to take the project to its culmination. He indicated that 4 workshops had to be created for the realization of the work of art, three mounted in a special way in Mexico City and one in Ciudad del Carmen near the Industrial Fishing Port, where the last details of the work were carried out of art. He interpreted some parts of the Stella Maris, such as the look of the image that he stares at the citizens when they begin their journey inside their facilities, just as he said that the creation of said sculpture had different challenges, as well as difficulties, so the wave that lies at the foot of the image, represents the storm that was had and the Virgin poses her foot in a delicate way to appease the waters.

The project completed in honor of the Virgen del Carmen, weighs 12 tons and measures 12 meters high, had a total consort of 70 million pesos of which Oceanography reported that it had allocated some 44 million pesos in the landfill and construction of the base.
 Final stage of construction and assembly
This work was unveiled by Governor Fernando Ortega Bernés, the mayor of Ciudad del Carmen Enrique Iván González López and Bishop José Francisco González, within the framework of the Fiesta del Carmen celebrations. During the opening ceremony, the mayor explained that the image has a weight of 12 tons and a height of 12 meters, but seated at its base rises approximately 25 meters above sea level. In his speech, the state president described the night as "historic" and recalled that next year marks the 500th anniversary of the birth of the mestizo culture and the beginning of the evangelization process led by the Franciscans throughout the region.

 Tourism 

The Island of Carmen and its surrounding areas, is one of the areas in the southeast of the country with the greatest tourist potential, its territory is framed by beautiful landscapes of lake and marine type, complemented by the existence of archaeological remains and by the lush tropical vegetation. Similarly, Ciudad del Carmen retains that natural framework that represents being located between the Gulf of Mexico and the Laguna de Terms, which gives the population a very interesting tint. From Carmen, you can visit several sites with various tourist attractions, located in the southwest of the State of Campeche, stories like Palizada, Isla Aguada, Atasta, Sabancuy and Candelaria. Underpinning the tourist activity the emblematic places in Ciudad del Carmen are:

 Beaches

The coastal area of Ciudad del Carmen and of the Isla del Carmen, is made up of beautiful beaches; Some have various tourist services. In the urban area of Ciudad del Carmen the following beaches are located: Snail, Lace, Manigua, and North Beach.

To the east of Ciudad del Carmen, on the Isla del Carmen, there are the following beach areas: Bahamitas, Tortugueros, Port Royal, and Punta San Julián.

 Terms Lagoon

Bathed by its waters, to the south of Ciudad del Carmen is located Laguna de Terms, name that is due to the Spaniards who discovered the Isla del Carmen in 1518, believing that the lagoon separated what was believed then was the Yucatán island of mainland. The Laguna de Términos is the estuarine lagoon system of greater dimensions and volumes of the country, in it a part of the main hydrological network of the coastal area of the Gulf of Mexico flows. Species such as bass, crustaceans, shrimp, manatee and dolphins, among others, reproduce successfully in its waters. Its great diversity is due, in large part, to the river discharge it receives.

Beyond the Terms Lagoon extends the Protection Area of Flora and Fauna of the same name, in which Ciudad del Carmen is immersed. Large mangrove forests, swampy areas, low flood forests, medium and high jungles, tular, carrizales and popales serve as a reservoir of species - crustaceans and fish -, and form a favorable site for nesting and habitat for Birds, reptiles and mammals. The Laguna de Terms Flora and Fauna Protection Area has an extension of 705,016 hectares, which makes it one of the largest Protected Natural Areas in Mexico. The particular characteristics of the Laguna de Términos – unique on the planet – deserved that since 2004, it was declared a site Ramsar. In 2008 the wetlands of the protected natural area entered the indicative list of Mexican sites to be part of the world heritage of UNESCO. Due to the enormous natural wealth in which it is immersed, one of the natural vocations of Ciudad del Carmen is that of ecological tourism, forming the ideal scenario for the development and enjoyment of various activities ecotourism.
 Streets and historical buildings

Ciudad del Carmen has ancient and narrow streets, which allow tourists or visitors to permeate their history and traditions, such as the old Calle del Comercio (now 22), which along with the adjoining roads, were silent witnesses for more than 290 years of the development of extractive commercial activities such as dye stick, precious woods and chewing gum.

Other sites to highlight are:

  'Marian Diocesan Sanctuary of Our Lady of Carmen and Zaragoza Park.' The urban heart of Ciudad del Carmen is located in the area formed by the Marian Diocesan Sanctuary of Our Lady of Carmen and Zaragoza Park, the construction of the first begins in 1856, its architecture presents harmonious lines well proportioned in Your frontispiece. A hall, two towers and an angled eardrum between the edges of the gable roof, three against forts give solidity to the lateral structure and its gray and white marble altar serves as accommodation for the beautiful image of the Virgen del Carmen, Patroness of the sailors. The Zaragoza park, with a beautiful area of wide vegetation, is located integrating this civic religious area, where besides the church, the City Theater, the University Cultural Center and the fountain named "Monument to the History of the Laguna de Términos". Highlights the beautiful and traditional kiosk, one of the representative images of the city.

  'Victorian Snow Museum.' Located in an old hospital, it reviews the pre-Columbian times, as well as the history of Ciudad del Carmen and its impressive incorporation into the economy of modern Mexico. They highlight here the excellent examples of Mayan pottery, a ship integrated to the permanent exhibition, the early history of the Island of Tris, the expulsion of English pirates and the foundation of the Carmen prison, in addition to the large stick extraction of dye during the first half of the 19th century. In this enclosure you can know the various historical scenarios of the Carmen Region from pre-Hispanic times, through the conquest and colony, to the present day.

  'El Zacatal Bridge and Malecon.'  
The El Zacatal bridge is the longest bridge in Latin America of its kind, with a length of 3861 meters and a width of 9 meters. It is one of the busiest in the country as it is the entrance to the Yucatán Peninsula, it has two lanes, one in each direction, passable by any type of vehicle.

Every day, at 8:00 p.m. and 9:00 p.m. there is a light and sound show that praises the greatness of this civil engineering work. Illuminating the bridge synchronously with the decorative elements of the boardwalk, during this show a video about the history of the island of Carmen called "Ventanas" and a video about tourism in Campeche is transmitted. The illumination of the bridge and the boardwalk remains late at night. If you are lucky you can see dolphins from the bridge and on the boardwalk at sunset.

 Other sites of interest

In addition to its natural beauty, the City and Port of Carmen offer the visitor more modern places to visit, including shopping centers, entertainment venues, modern hotels, restaurants, and a zoo.

Without losing its essence and flavor of an island, Ciudad del Carmen has been incorporated into the modernity demanded by the population increase itself and by the economic dynamics imposed by the oil industry, which is why it now offers visitors a variety of options in gastronomic, lodging, culture, fun and entertainment. The comforts and commercial offer of any modern city, are an excellent complement to its beach's and natural attractions.

 Sports infrastructure 

 The Resurgence Stadium was inaugurated on March 5, 1967 by Governor José Ortiz Ávila, it hosted the local baseball team "Camaroneros del Carmen", who in their first meeting played against the Red Devils of Mexico, the visiting team won 8–4. Another team that also resided the Delfines del Carmen team that participated in the Mexican Baseball League, its capacity is 8,200 people. Located in Av. Juárez, Petrolera, 24180.
 The "Delfín" stadium had a professional football team called Delfines Fútbol Club participating in the league MX Ascent debuting in the Tournament Opening 2013, with capacity for 15,100 people. Located in Corregidora Avenue, Santa Rosalia, Ciudad del Carmen, Campeche. Both properties are owned by the UNACAR.
 The municipal baseball stadium "Nelson Barrera Romellón" is a building located southwest of the island of Carmen formerly known as the "Concordia Stadium" in the city's Fishing Port. He gets his current name in honor of the Carmelite baseball player and member of Mexico's Professional Baseball Hall of Fame,  Nelson Barrera Romellón "El Almirante", who died in July 2002 in the capital of the State. On the esplanade outside the stadium there is a statue in his memory. Currently the "Camaroneros del Carmen" play in the baseball league. It is also a space for artistic, cultural, sports and religious events. Belonging to the City Council of Carmen. Located on Avenida Heroes on April 21, Ciudad del Carmen, Campeche, Mexico.
 "Mundo Maya" Sports Unit Inaugurated on June 6, 2017, by the Secretary of Government, Carlos Miguel Aysa González, along with the General Director of Petróleos Mexicanos (Pemex), José Antonio González Anaya and the General Secretary of the Workers Union Petroleros de la República Mexicana (STPRM), Carlos Romero Deschamps, after 10 years in planning and construction, the unit has soccer fields, beach volleyball, multiple uses and medical service areas, semi-Olympic pool, basketball courts, baseball, volleyball Conventional and tennis, as well as a roofed gym, multipurpose room, among other spaces. Located in Av. Edzna, Mundo Maya, Cd del Carmen, Camp.
 The "Revolution" Court In this venue the Camaroneros del Carmen (Basketball) play in the LIBASSUR league (Southwest Basketball League), regional boxing functions, wrestling, basketball tournaments (First Force), volleyball are also held, different types of martial arts, futsal etc. With capacity for 1,000 people. Located on 31st Street - Colonia Centro, Carmen, Campeche.
 Sports Unit "November 20" It is one of the longest sports spaces on the island, belonging to INDEJUCAR, is mainly composed of its softball / baseball field known as the "Revolution" field (not to be confused with the "Revolution" field) The interior has two gyms, the first is the Municipal Gymnasium "Joaquín Vadillo Sandoval", the other is the sports center for basketball / volleyball, as well as a variety of multi-purpose courts. Because of them, the following disciplines are taught: volleyball, baseball, softball, boxing, soccer, Karate Do, Tae Kwon Do, Judo, basketball, weightlifting, chess, fitnees, tennis, cachibol, pediment, squash handball, and sports shooting. It is located on Calle 26, Puerto Pesquero, 24129 Carmen, Campeche, Mexico.
 Children's Sports Unit Contests of the Children's League "Hugo Sánchez Márquez" are played, apart from hosting football, soccer, baseball, volleyball, basketball, athletics and rugby. Located in Insurgentes s / n, Colonia Malibran, 24197 Cd del Carmen, Camp.

 Communications infrastructure 

The city has different access routes of land, sea and air, which allows it to be one of the best communicated cities in the state of Campeche.

In the land-type access, the Isla del Carmen is communicated in the far east by the Unity Bridge that links it with the town of Isla Aguada and in the southern part the El Zacatal Bridge that links the island with the Atasta Peninsula. As regards the maritime access, it is given through the Puerto Isla del Carmen. In the access by air, it is achieved through Ciudad del Carmen International Airport and a helipad.

Among its main avenues are: Avenida 10 de Julio, formerly known as Periférica Sur and Luis Donaldo Colosio, is one of the main avenues that lead to El Zacatal Bridge, the exit to Villahermosa, Avenida Isla de Tris, connects the two parts of the city and it is the only direct route to the city of Campeche, the Juarez and North Peripheral Avenues, move motorists from North to South. Others are Avenida 31, Paseo del Mar Avenue, Camarón Avenue, Nardos Avenue, Constellation Pleiades Avenue, Central Avenue, Contadores Avenue, among others.

 Puerto Isla del Carmen 

Ciudad del Carmen has historically been a natural port, which has allowed it to have a relevant position over the centuries in the commercial sphere, not only regionally but also nationally and internationally.

In the past, the concept of City and Port was closely linked since all the activity of the population moved directly or indirectly on the basis of port commercial activities, occupying the areas of docks, shipyards, and support areas, the whole front from La Puntilla to the Lighthouse of La Atalaya.

With the arrival of the Camarón boom, the Laguna Azul Fishing Port was built, located between the La Caleta estuary and the Gulf of Mexico, an installation that operated until the occurrence of two events: the increase in oil production and the decline in shrimp catch volumes.

Today, the Puerto Isla del Carmen is the port with the highest number of ship movements registered nationwide, being the axis of support work in terms of the movement of personnel, food, and materials of smaller scale in the area of oil exploitation of Campeche Bank, and it is in a stage of modernization and expansion of its facilities.

 Ciudad del Carmen International Airport 

The International Airport of Ciudad del Carmen is located to the east of the city, very close to the commercial area and the main hotels, and is of vital importance for the economic activity that takes place in Ciudad del Carmen.
The airport was incorporated into the Network ASA in 1965, has an area of approximately 192 hectares and its platform for commercial aviation is 10,484 square meters; It also has three positions, a track 2.2 kilometers long and has its own parking lot. It also offers car rental and public transport services.

It is notable to note that within the airport facilities a helipad is located with several companies that work through contracts for Petróleos Mexicanos. This helipad occupies the number one place in flight hours nationwide and is one of the helipads with the most flight hours on the continental and international levels.
In 2008, Ciudad del Carmen International Airport received 586 & 950 passengers, according to data published by Airports and Auxiliary Services (ASA), so it is located within the 22 airports with more traffic Mexico's air There is also a project to expand the terminal building and public parking, the construction of a machine house, among other things.

It should be mentioned that among the lands belonging to the international airport of Ciudad del Carmen, important commercial centers of vital importance for the economic growth of the island have been built, such as the recent construction of one of the most important commercial centers within the city Zentralia Square which houses important commercial and departmental chains as well as a variety of fast food chains among others, in addition to the recent incorporation of the exclusive executive tower for offices.

 Culture 

 Holidays 

The name and veneration of the Virgin of Carmen was born in a circumstantial way, motivated by the order that Felipe V made the Viceroy of New Spain, Marquis de Valeros, for which the Windward squad joined several Campeche vessels manned by campers who were vividly interested in throwing their terrible enemies off the island, the expedition was entrusted to Don Alonso Felipe de Andrade, who achieved a glorious victory over the pirates on the 16th of July 1717.

In commemoration of that historic event every July 16 of each year, the most important religious festival is celebrated in honor of Our Lady of Carmen, where religious and popular events are held, in which the sea walk of the Virgin of Carmen. This religious festival is called the July International Fair of Ciudad del Carmen, which is held annually from July 15 to 31, based in the Tourist Complex of Playa Norte, built in 1971 as a fairground; with religious events, mechanical games, fishing tournaments and dances and merchants of all kinds of things are established. This fair has not had interruptions of any kind.
Among the other traditions of Ciudad del Carmen is the Carnival, which has been celebrated 216 times without interruptions, and is a party full of color and excitement that is celebrated in honor of King Momo. In April the Festival of the Sea is held, where there is gastronomic shows, mechanical games and sports competitions.

Tradition is the Guanal Fair in honor of Our Lady of the Assumption, from August 1 to 15. The neighborhood where the fair is held is known as Guanal because years before 1900 all the houses in the place had a guano roof. On July 16, 2017, Ciudad del Carmen would be celebrating the 300th Anniversary of its foundation.

 Crafts 
Because Ciudad del Carmen is located on an island, the materials of its crafts are based on shells, snails and fish scales with which lamps, vases, ashtrays, earrings, key chains, pins, jewelry and various ornaments are made. Related to the sea, there are also miniature ships and figures of animals and pirates that are made of coconut.

The handicrafts of this town also include woodcarving works such as spice boxes, jewelry boxes, cigar boxes, ashtrays, salt shakers, kitchen boards and meat mallets. Likewise, the elaboration of key chains, wallets, checkbooks, agendas, bags for women and purses of shark skin. There are some artisans who are dedicated to carving bull horn from which they create bracelets, earrings, key chains, hair pins and open letters, among other items.

 As a film venue 
In 1975, the film The braid was filmed on the island by director Sergio Béjar, whose protagonists are David Reynoso, Yolanda Ciani and Erick del Castillo and that was released on March 13 of the same year. In the 70s the French film was filmed in the same way Rum boulevard with Brigitte Bardot. In 2017, film tape is produced  El Tormentero  directed by Rubén Imaz and performed by José Carlos Ruiz, who is a shrimp fisherman discovers in one of his trips a huge oil well.

 Urbanism 
In 2009, the Municipal Planning Institute, an organization created to promote integral and long-term development, directing the information and strategic planning processes of the municipality of Carmen, presented the Urban Director Program of Ciudad del Carmen, called: "A beautiful, competitive, sustainable and inclusive city", commemorates a project execution horizon in the short, medium and long term and a review period of every three years.

Among the topics addressed in the Urban Director Program are the land use and destination planning, policies by areas and conservation, improvement and growth actions and urban development policies and guidelines for the prevention of phenomena risks natural and man-made. The urban development norms on the road structure, transport, infrastructure and public services and the secondary zoning of land uses and destinations to which urban areas and land susceptible to urbanization can be dedicated were also taken into account. In the same way, the zoning regulations that regulate in each of the zones that are established: the permitted and prohibited uses and destinations of the land, the density and intensity in the use of the land, minimum surface of urban lots, surface and height maximum that can be built, lateral construction restrictions, parking requirements and other urban structure standards. Among other things.

 Occupation strategy of the Isla del Carmen 
The planning approach established in the new Urban Director Program considers that:

Ciudad del Carmen is integrated into the natural area of Isla del Carmen, so it is necessary to strengthen the unity and harmonic relations between the city and its environment. In this sense, it will seek to promote the adequate development of the island complex that will ensure the patrimonial integrity of the island by promoting actions aimed at the conservation, protection and restoration of the natural environment, as well as the use of the building. According to the current conditions and the new planning instruments at the municipal and regional level, the areas previously considered as part of the urban system of cities of Carmen, can now be established as population centers that are part of a broader regional system.

In this way, Isla del Carmen is defined as the population center of Ciudad del Carmen and includes the urban area of the city with its reserve, Lagartera or Isla Media and Puerto Real. The city can be considered as an industrial and business tourism center, it will include the urban area and areas of economic activities such as services related to the exploitation of oil, but areas for economic activities will also be promoted parallel to that of Petroleum such as tourism and fishing; in the Lagartera or Media Island area, tourist use, fishing and activities related to these activities will prevail. On the other hand, Puerto Real will have a low intensity tourism development related to low impact tourism. Los programas que se consultaron en la elaboración del PDU fueron:

 Plan de Manejo de Flora y Fauna de la Laguna de Términos elaborado en 1997.
 Programa Municipal de Ordenamiento Ecológico y Territorial de Carmen, Campeche, en proceso de elaboración.
 Programa Regional de Desarrollo Turístico del Corredor Costero, Ciudad de San Francisco de Campeche-Ciudad del Carmen, en proceso.

 Economy 

Ciudad del Carmen has been of great importance for the development of the state of Campeche and the country, due to its geographical position and the richness of the natural resources that surround it; At first, the bonanza derived from the exploitation of dye stick and chewing gum came, later, it came with shrimp fishing. At present, it retains its strategic position in the economy, but now generated by a different source, oil. The oil is extracted from the 'Sonda de Campeche, with Ciudad del Carmen as its main base of operations, this situation makes it a center where complementary services are required for the exploration and production activities of crude oil that develops the company parastatal Petróleos Mexicanos.

Geography

Administration
Ciudad del Carmen is the head of Carmen municipality.

Climate
Like most of the cities along the Yucatán's Gulf Coast, Ciudad del Carmen exhibits a Tropical savanna climate. The city, situated on Carmen Island, has a pronounced dry season that lasts from January through May, with the wet season finishing out the year. September and October bring copious rainfall, with both months averaging well over 200 millimeters.

People
The vast majority of the inhabitants in Ciudad del Carmen come from other places. This extreme emigration and immigration pattern displays diversity in culture and lifestyle; the petroleum industry is in part responsible for this phenomenon that results in a rich and extraordinary culture mix.

Petroleum

In the mid 1970s Ciudad del Carmen was transformed from a fishing and shrimping city into a hub for oil when Pemex discovered large amounts of petroleum off the coast.  Ever since, Carmen has become a home for Mexican and foreign oil workers alike, including many Texans, and now houses many foreign companies Campeche-Carmen.

Tourism

Sister cities

International
 Aarhus, Denmark
 Wilmington, North Carolina, United States

References

Works cited
 
 
 

Link to tables of population data from Census of 2005 Instituto Nacional de Estadística, Geografía e Informática (INEGI)
Map of the Bay of Campeche

External links 

 Noticias e Información
 University of Ciudad del Carmen
 
 

Populated places established in 1856
Populated places in Campeche
Ports of the Gulf of Mexico
Port cities and towns of the Mexican Gulf Coast
Populated places in islands of Mexico
Municipality seats in Campeche
Islands of Mexico